Arnout Coninx (1548–1617) was a printer and bookseller in the city of Antwerp from 1579 until his death in 1617. In 1586 he was fined for unlicensed printing, and in 1591 he was investigated for selling forbidden books. When the city of Antwerp had been reconquered for Philip II of Spain in 1585, Protestants had been given four years to settle their affairs and leave or be reconciled to the Catholic Church. Coninx waited until 1590, after the deadline had passed, to register his conversion to Catholicism.

Publications
 1584: Desiderius Erasmus, Moriae encomion dat is eenen loff der sotheyt. Available on Google Books
 1586: Marcus Aurelius, T'Gulde-boec van den loflijken keyser ende welsprekenden oratoor Marcus Aurelius. Available on Google Books
 1591: Jan van der Noot, De poeticsche werken van myn heer vander Noot. Available on Google Books
 1594: Leon De Meyere, Prosopopée d'Anvers à la bienvenue du Sérénissime prince Ernest par la grâce de Dieu archiduc d'Autriche, etc., lieutenant gouverneur et capitaine général des Pays-Bas
 1601: Antonio Ortiz, A relation of the solemnetie wherewith the Catholike princes K. Phillip the III. and Quene Margaret were receyued in the Inglish Colledge of Valladolid the 22. of August, 1600, tr. Francis Rivers
 1606: Philip Numan, Miracles lately wrought by the intercession of the Glorious Virgin Mary at Mont-aigu, nere unto Sichen in Brabant, translated by Robert Chambers
 1608: Jean Zuallart, Le très dévot voyage de Jérusalem. Available on Google Books
 1615: Jan Franco, Ephemeris metheorologica. Seer schoone declaratie vande revolutien ende inclinatien van desen [...] jaere ons Heeren. M.D.C.XV.

References

1548 births
1617 deaths
16th-century printers
17th-century printers
16th-century publishers (people)
17th-century publishers (people)
Book publishers (people) of the Habsburg Netherlands